Unc-93 homolog B1 (C. elegans), also known as UNC93B1, is a protein which in humans is encoded by the UNC93B1 gene.

Function 

This gene encodes a protein with similarity to the Caenorhabditis elegans unc93 protein. The Unc93 protein is involved in the regulation or coordination of muscle contraction in the worm.

Molecular biology

The gene is located on long arm of chromosome 11 (11q13) on the minus (Crick) strand and was first identified in 2002. This protein is an intrinsic membrane protein that spans the membrane twelve times. It is found in the endoplasmic reticulum and is highly conserved.

Clinical importance

Unc93B1 protein appears to be involved in the innate immune response. Defects in the protein predispose to hypersensitity to infections with herpes simplex virus and mouse cytomegalovirus. The mechanism is unclear but Unc93B1 is known to interact with the toll-like receptors TLR3, TLR7 and TLR9 and it appears to be involved in the trafficking of these receptors within the cell. Mutations in this gene lead to selective impairment of dsRNA-induced interferon alpha/beta and interferon 1 lambda production.

The intracellular toll-like receptors have been shown to interact with UNC93B in splenocytes and bone marrow-derived dendritic cells. TLR3 and TLR9 bind to UNC93B via their transmembrane domains. Introduction of the point mutation H412R (histidine to arginine at amino acid 412: a single base transition - adenosine to guanine at base 1235) in UNC93B abolishes this interaction.

References

Further reading